In geometric measure theory an approximate tangent space is a measure theoretic generalization of the concept of a tangent space for a differentiable manifold.

Definition 

In differential geometry the defining characteristic of a tangent space is that it approximates the smooth manifold to first order near the point of tangency. Equivalently, if we zoom in more and more at the point of tangency the manifold appears to become more and more straight, asymptotically tending to approach the tangent space. This turns out to be the correct point of view in geometric measure theory.

Definition for sets 

Definition. Let  be a set that is measurable with respect to m-dimensional Hausdorff measure , and such that the restriction measure  is a Radon measure.

 as 

in the sense of Radon measures. Here for any measure  we denote by  the rescaled and translated measure:

Certainly any classical tangent space to a smooth submanifold is an approximate tangent space, but the converse is not necessarily true.

Multiplicities 

The parabola

is a smooth 1-dimensional submanifold. Its tangent space at the origin  is the horizontal line . On the other hand, if we incorporate the reflection along the x-axis:

then  is no longer a smooth 1-dimensional submanifold, and there is no classical tangent space at the origin. On the other hand, by zooming in at the origin the set  is approximately equal to two straight lines that overlap in the limit. It would be reasonable to say it has an approximate tangent space  with multiplicity two.

Definition for measures 

One can generalize the previous definition and proceed to define approximate tangent spaces for certain Radon measures, allowing for multiplicities as explained in the section above.

Definition.

 as 

in the sense of Radon measures.

This definition generalizes the one for sets as one can see by taking  for any  as in that section. It also accounts for the reflected paraboloid example above because for  we have  with multiplicity two.

Relation to rectifiable sets 

The notion of approximate tangent spaces is very closely related to that of rectifiable sets. Loosely speaking, rectifiable sets are precisely those for which approximate tangent spaces exist almost everywhere. The following lemma encapsulates this relationship:

Lemma. Let  be measurable with respect to m-dimensional Hausdorff measure. Then  is m-rectifiable if and only if there exists a positive locally -integrable function  such that the Radon measure

has approximate tangent spaces  for -almost every .

References
, particularly Chapter 3, Section 11 "'Basic Notions, Tangent Properties.''"

Geometry
Measure theory